A Flap Rudder (aka a "Becker rudder") is a specific type of multi-section rudder used on boats and ships. The hinged aft section gives the rudder an extra control surface, enhancing its efficiency.

According to  Kongsberg "A flap rudder produces more side force than a classic rudder of equivalent size. Depending on shipowner requirements, a flap rudder may be used to reduce the overall area of a rudder whilst maintaining equal lift forces".

Design
The flap rudder is designed to improve the effective lift generated by the rudder and hence improve the manoeuvrability of the craft.

The rudder consists of two or more sections which move relative to each other as helm is applied and the angle of the main or driven section moves, thus the shape of the rudder changes dynamically as the angle of helm is changed. 

In a two-part flap rudder, the aft part (the "flap") pivots back towards the centreline, thus producing a more hydrodynamic cross-section which increases lift and reduces the chance of stalling.

Although a flap rudder is more compact than a conventional rudder, it has the disadvantage of extra cost and more moving parts. Arguably, on a ship or boat, most of the benefits of a flap rudder may be achieved by the simpler one-piece Schilling rudder.

See also

References 

Watercraft components